Cornelius Boots (Cornelius Shinzen Boots) is an American composer and multi-instrumentalist. Best known for founding and leading Edmund Welles, the only composing bass clarinet quartet in the world, he  now mainly plays and composes for the shakuhachi flute having retired from bass clarinet in 2015

He received his shakuhachi master teaching’s license (Shihan) from Grand Master Michael Chikuzen Gould in 2013. He has recorded five albums and performs internationally. He played on stage during Sony's E3 2018 conference, prior to the reveal of Ghost of Tsushima, a samurai-based video game.

Boots mostly plays taimu shakuhachi, which are long, wide-bore flutes noted for their deep tones.

References

External links 
 
 
 
Interview on The Next Track podcast

1974 births
Living people
Shakuhachi players
American male composers
21st-century American composers
American clarinetists
American jazz bass clarinetists
21st-century American male musicians
Edmund Welles members
21st-century flautists